Aqabat Jaber is a Palestinian refugee camp in the Jericho Governorate of the eastern West Bank, situated in the Jordan Valley, three kilometers southwest of Jericho.

History
Aqabat Jaber was established in 1948 on 1,688 dunams of arid land near the Dead Sea. Prior to the 1967 Six-Day War, the number of registered Palestinian refugees totaled around 30,000. During and after the hostilities, the majority of refugees fled the camp and crossed the Jordan River. On 13 November 1985, following an agreement with UNRWA, the Israeli authorities began a program of demolishing unused houses. At the time the camp’s population was 3,000. Following the signing of the Gaza–Jericho Agreement in 1994, the camp came under the control of the Palestinian National Authority.

In 2005 Aqabat Jaber had a population of 5,566 registered refugees. Non-refugees have moved onto the camp's lands and built illegal homes.

Water availability
Water scarcity is a major problem in this desert area, especially during the summer. The UNRWA is able to provide some water to the camp by pumping it from a nearby spring. However, the Israeli water company Mekorot is the main supplier of water to the camp.

Filmography
 Eyal Sivan: Aqabat-Jaber, passing through (1987)

References

External links
Aqbat Jaber refugee camp, UNRWA
Welcome To 'Aqbat Jabir R.C.
Aqbat Jaber Camp (Fact Sheet), Applied Research Institute–Jerusalem (ARIJ)
Aqbat Jaber Camp Profile  (ARIJ)
Aqbat aerial photo (ARIJ)
Locality Development Priorities and Needs in 'Aqbat Jaber Camp (ARIJ)

Jericho Governorate
Populated places established in 1948
Palestinian refugee camps in the West Bank
Municipalities of the State of Palestine